is a railway station in Niki, Hokkaidō, Hokkaidō, Japan. It is operated by JR Hokkaido and has the station number "S21".

Lines

Station layout
The station has two side platforms serving two tracks, connected by a rail crossing.

Platforms

Adjacent stations

History
After the Hokkaido Railway was nationalized on 1 July 1907, Japanese Government Railways (JGR) took over control of the station. On 12 October 1909 the station became part of the Hakodate Main Line. On 1 April 1987, with the privatization of Japanese National Railways (JNR), the successor of JGR, the station came under the control of JR Hokkaido. From 1 October 2007, station numbering was introduced on JR Hokkaido lines, with Ginzan Station becoming "S21".

References

Railway stations in Hokkaido Prefecture
Railway stations in Japan opened in 1905